Yedisu District is a district of Bingöl Province in Turkey. The town of Yedisu is the seat and the district had a population of 2,852 in 2021.

The district was established in 1990.

Composition 
Beside the town of Yedisu, the district encompasses thirteen villages and fifty-eight hamlets.

 Akımlı
 Ayanoğlu
 Dinarbey
 Elmalı
 Eskibalta 
 Gelinpertek
 Güzgülü
 Kabayel
 Karapolat
 Kaşıklı
 Şenköy
 Yağmurpınar
 Yeşilgöl

References 

Districts of Bingöl Province
Yedisu District